Lenox is an unincorporated community in Dyer County, Tennessee, United States. Its ZIP code is 38047.

Demographics

Notes

Unincorporated communities in Dyer County, Tennessee
Unincorporated communities in Tennessee